The 1979 Intercontinental Final was the fifth running of the Intercontinental Final as part of the qualification for the 1979 Speedway World Championship. The 1979 Final was run on 5 August at the White City Stadium in London, England, and was the last qualifying stage for riders from Scandinavia, the USA and from the Commonwealth nations for the World Final to be held at the Silesian Stadium in Chorzów, Poland.

In front of their home crowd, 20-year-old sensation Michael Lee and 1976 World Champion Peter Collins dominated the meeting with Lee defeating Collins in a runoff after both finished on 14 points. Four points back was Denmark's Finn Thomsen who defeated Dave Jessup and Ivan Mauger in a runoff for third place. Mauger would go on to make history in Poland, winning his record 6th Individual World Championship.

Surprise non-qualifiers for the World Final were England's Gordon Kennett (who had finished second in the 1978 World Final at Wembley) and Finland's Kai Niemi. Both riders rode for the British League club White City with the  White City Stadium being their home track.

1979 Intercontinental Final
8 August
 London, White City Stadium
Qualification: Top 9 plus 1 reserve to the World Final in Chorzów, Poland

Kelly Moran replaced Mike Bast

References

See also
 Motorcycle Speedway

1979
World Individual
Intercontinental Final
Intercontinental Final